Chadwick Jarrett Fairchild (born December 30, 1970) is an American umpire in Major League Baseball. He wore number 75 until the 2014 season, when he changed to number 4 (formerly worn by Tim Tschida). He has worked in one All-Star Game (2013) and six Division Series (2011, 2012, 2015, 2018, 2021, 2022). In 2017, he worked the ALCS between the Houston Astros and New York Yankees and was the plate umpire for Game 1.

Career
Fairchild has worked in both major leagues since umpiring his first game on September 30, 2004. He has umpired professionally since 1997, having worked in the Gulf Coast League, New York–Penn League, South Atlantic League, Florida State League, Southern League and International League before reaching the majors. He also officiated in the 2006 World Baseball Classic.

Fairchild was listed by The Hardball Times as having one of the smallest strike zones in the 2011 season.

Personal life
Fairchild is a native of Wakeman, Ohio. Fairchild lives in Florida, and has one son.

See also

 List of Major League Baseball umpires

References

External links
MLB.com profile
Retrosheet

1970 births
Living people
Sportspeople from Sandusky, Ohio
Major League Baseball umpires
Bluffton University alumni